Tuseh Chaleh (also Romanized as Tūseh Chāleh; also known as Tūseh Chālak) is a village in Shuil Rural District, Rahimabad District, Rudsar County, Gilan Province, Iran. At the 2006 census, its population was 79.

References 

Populated places in Rudsar County